Pecorama (or Pecorama Pleasure Gardens) is a tourist attraction on the hillside above the village of Beer, Devon, in southwest England, that includes a display of many model railways, gardens, a shop, and the Beer Heights Light Railway.

The attraction is owned and run by PECO, a UK-based manufacturer of model railway accessories. The factory is on the same site.

Pecorama is also home to "Teddy Mac and the Railway Bears", a series of children's books written by Margaret Edmonds.

See also
 Beer Quarry Caves
 Beer Village Website - What to do in Beer

References

External links

Pecorama website

Year of establishment missing
Tourist attractions in Devon
Heritage railways in Devon
Gardens in Devon
Miniature railways in the United Kingdom